Irma Schultz (born 1 October 1965) is a Swedish actress and pop singer who has appeared in many movies and television series in Sweden. She has acted in American productions such as the horror movie The Resurrection of Michael Myers Part 2 and the miniseries "Xerxes". She graduated from the Swedish National Academy of Mime and Acting in 1999.

Irma Schultz was married to Nino Keller, drummer in Swedish rock band Ceasars Palace for fifteen years. During that period she also performed under the name Irma Schultz Keller. The couple divorced in 2015 and had two common kids.

On 3 March 2007 Irma Schultz and Uno Svenningsson performed the song God morgon in Melodifestivalen 2007 and made it as Uno & Irma to the Second Chance Round. But the duo lost to Sonja Alden in the first voting and were eliminated from the contest.

Discography

Albums 
As Zzzang Tumb
1982: 37 Minuter i Stockholms City (Stranded Rekords)
1983: Zzzang Tumb (Stranded Rekords)

As Paris Bis
1986: Body & Soul Mekano, single/maxisingle

Studio albums
 1989: Då staden har vaknat
 1991: Irma
 1993: Tröst för stygga barn
 1995: Andas fritt
 2003: Imma på glas
 2006: Sånger för December (Uno Svenningsson feat. Irma Schultz Keller)
 2007: Psalmer
 2010: Blank is – sånger av Joni Mitchell
 2011: December – En svensk jul (Uno Svenningsson & Irma Schultz Keller)

Singles 
 1988: "Tillbaks till mig"
 1989: "Vem är du?"
 1989: "För varje steg"
 1990: "Decembersnö"
 1991: "Stureplan"
 1991: ""Precis som du"
 1991: "Någonstans inom mig"
 1991: "I mitt hus"
 1992: "Decembersnö" (new version)
 1993: "Kom ner (Lämna vingarna kvar)"
 1993: "Min räddning"
 1995: "Andas fritt"
 1995: "Vad hände med oss två"
 1996: "Bomull och blad"
 2003: "Stereo"
 2007: "God morgon" (duo with Uno Svenningsson)
 2010: "Jag kan dricka friskt av dig"

References

External links 

Irma Schultz Keller , SVT

1965 births
Living people
Swedish actresses
Swedish women singers
Swedish pop singers
Actresses from Stockholm
Singers from Stockholm
Melodifestivalen contestants of 2007
Melodifestivalen contestants of 2006